Mighty Mouse is a cartoon superhero.

Mighty Mouse may also refer to:

Mighty Mouse: The New Adventures, an American animated television series featuring the cartoon character
Mighty Mouse (film), an upcoming film starring the cartoon character
"The Mighty Space Mouse", a 1984 episode of Voltron
Mighty Mouse (nickname), various people
Kevin 'Mighty' Mouse, a fictional footballer in the British comic strip Hot Shot Hamish and Mighty Mouse
Mighty mice, a genetic strain of house mouse with the myostatin gene knocked out
Mighty Mouse, the first mouse with a scroll wheel jointly developed by NTT and ETH Zürich in 1985
Apple Mighty Mouse, the first multi-button computer mouse produced by Apple Inc.
Mk 4 FFAR Fin-Folding Aerial Rockets, used by the United States Air Force